The State Council of East Germany (German: Staatsrat der DDR) was the collective head of state of the German Democratic Republic (East Germany) from 1960 to 1990.

Origins
When the German Democratic Republic was founded in October 1949, its constitution in its formal structure resembled a bourgeois, federalist democratic system in order to portray the GDR as the legitimate continuation of the prewar Weimar Republic in opposition to the separatist Federal Republic. One of the "bourgeois" features of the constitution (in Article 66) was the office of President, which was filled by Wilhelm Pieck, formerly the leader of the eastern branch of the Communist Party of Germany and now one of the two chairmen of the Socialist Unity Party of Germany (SED). 

However, from the start, the East German government was completely controlled by the SED, and over time its actual power structure grew closer to the model of the Stalinist USSR. When Pieck died on 7 September 1960, the SED opted against electing a successor, instead opting for a Soviet-style collective head of state. The constitution was amended on 12 September 1960 by the Law concerning the formation of the State Council, which created a collective body in place of the presidency. The same constitutional amendment also acknowledged the role of the recently formed National Defense Council (Nationaler Verteidigungsrat) in GDR defense policy. The State Council remained virtually unchanged in the 1968 constitution, but its official role was later downplayed in the 1974 constitutional amendments.

Election

The State Council was elected by the People's Chamber, the East German parliament. Its term was originally four years, but was later changed to five years.

The body consisted of a chairman, several deputy chairmen (usually six), further members (usually sixteen) and a secretary. Members were taken from the political parties and mass organizations affiliated to the SED-controlled National Front. Occasionally an otherwise prominent citizen was also included.  Outside of East Germany, the chairman's post was reckoned as being equivalent to that of president.

On paper, the Chairman of the State Council was the second highest ranking state official in East Germany, following the Chairman of the Council of Ministers. In practice, however, the chairmanship was occupied by the leader of the SED for all but a few years of its existence. The sole exceptions were the period of transition from the leadership of Walter Ulbricht to Erich Honecker from 1971 to 1976 and the immediate aftermath of the SED's collapse in 1989. The leaders of the smaller parties in the National Front served as deputy chairmen on the council.

Constitutional powers

Powers of the State council included
to call elections to the People's Chamber and other parliamentary bodies
to appoint members to the National Defense Council
to grant pardon, amnesty and reprieves
to ratify international treaties
to grant diplomatic accreditation
to grant decorations and awards
to sponsor families with many children

Originally, the State Council also could issue statutory decrees and legally-binding interpretations of the constitution and laws. The diplomatic role of head of state solely rested with the chairman. Both the body's legislative and judicial powers and the chairman's special diplomatic status were formally abolished in 1974.

Though the Council formally exercised its functions collectively, it was dominated by its chairman, especially if the chairman was also leader of the SED. In contrast, the predecessor post of president was a relatively weak position. However, the body had some importance as an advisory and decision-making body under Walter Ulbricht. When Ulbricht lost power in the early 1970s, the body was reduced to a ceremonial role. The 1974 amendments reflected this development; when Honecker became chairman in 1976, he derived virtually all of his power from his post as leader of the SED.

The secretariat of the State Council was of some practical importance as its approximately 200 employees since 1961 dealt with citizens' petitions. Authorities in government and economics were obliged to cooperate with the secretariat on this.

Abolition

When Egon Krenz, Honecker's successor as leader of the SED, failed in his bid to preserve Communist rule in East Germany, he resigned from his offices in party and government, including as Chairman of the State Council. To mark the end of the SED's monopoly on power, LDPD leader Manfred Gerlach was elected chairman. However, the body ceased to be of political importance and merely oversaw the transition to the parliamentary elections of March 1990.

The new People's Chamber, the first that emerged from free elections, met for the first time on 5 April 1990. Among its first measures was an amendment to the constitution abolishing the State Council. As provided in the constitution, the president of the People's Chamber, Sabine Bergmann-Pohl, served as interim head of state until reunification with West Germany on 3 October.

List of members

References

Government of East Germany
1960 establishments in East Germany
1990 disestablishments in East Germany
Collective heads of state